Baillestavy is a commune in the Pyrénées-Orientales department in southern France.

Geography

Localisation 
Baillestavy is located in the canton of Le Canigou and in the arrondissement of Prades.

Hydrography 
Baillestavy is crossed by the Lentillà river, a tributary of the Tech.

Government and politics

Mayors

Population

See also
Communes of the Pyrénées-Orientales department

References

External links 

  Official site

Communes of Pyrénées-Orientales